Marine Torpedo Bombing Squadron 151 (VMTB-151) was a dive bombing squadron in the United States Marine Corps.  The squadron fought in World War II  but was quickly deactivated after the war on March 20, 1946.

History
Marine Observation Squadron 1 (VMO-1) was commissioned on July 1, 1937 at Marine Corps Base Quantico.  They were redesignated Marine Observation Squadron 151 (VMO-151) on July 1, 1941.  The squadron left for San Diego, California in December 1941 with the rest of the 1st Marine Aircraft Wing, but returned to MCB Quantico in January 1942.    From January to April, they trained at Naval Station Norfolk until departing for Tafuna Airfield in American Samoa on April 9, 1942.  They arrived a month later and remained for the next 13 months.  On September 15, 1942, the squadron was re-designated again, this time as Marine Scout Bombing Squadron 151 (VMSB-151).

On June 10, 1943, the squadron moved to Uvea Island in the Wallis Group.  The squadron remained there until February 29, 1944 when they arrived at Engebi.  From March 9–12, the squadron covered Marine landings on Wotho Atoll, Ujae Atoll and Lae Atoll.  During this time, they also made bombing runs against by-passed Japanese bases in the Marshall Islands until May 31, 1945.  On June 9, 1945, the squadron returned to the United States.

Upon return to Marine Corps Air Station Mojave, they were assigned to Marine Air Support Group 51  and were redesignated Marine Torpedo Bombing Squadron 151 (VMTB-151). on June 30, 1945. The squadron was deactivated at Marine Corps Air Station Santa Barbara, California on March 20, 1946.

See also 
 United States Marine Corps Aviation
 List of active United States Marine Corps aircraft squadrons
 List of decommissioned United States Marine Corps aircraft squadrons

References
Notes

Bibliography

Web

  VMSB-151

TBF
Inactive units of the United States Marine Corps